Tomo Johannes in der Mühlen aka Tom Tom or DJ Tomo is a German DJ, Producer and recording artist based in New York City and Zagreb.

Early life
Tomo In der Mühlen was born in Braunschweig and lives in New York City and Zagreb. Both of his parents, Johannes Willhelm in der Mühlen and Stana Kovačić in der Mühlen were architects. He studied at MIOC XV Gymnasium computer science and continued at Faculty of Science, University of Zagreb studying mathematics.

In der Mühlen started as a computer animation designer and coder for the quiz show Kviskoteka hosted by Oliver Mlakar, which aired from 1977 to 1980s on Hrvatska radiotelevizija, and later briefly aired on Nova TV.

Career
In der Mühlen has produced and performed live on productions from New York City, Los Angeles, Japan, Croatia, Italy and Serbia. He worked with Harold Perrineau, Styles P, Masta Ace, Muzz Skillings, Coati Mundi, Buddy Hankerson, Vernon Reid, Rade Šerbedžija, Bashiri Johnson, Ekatarina Velika, muMs da Schemer, Kurtis Blow, Risa Hirako – Lotta Love, Parni Valjak, Dino Merlin, Haustor, Cacadou Look, Josipa Lisac, Pankrti, Plavi orkestar, Alka Vuica, Željko Bebek, Mitar Subotić, Electro Team, Dubrovnik Summer Festival, Karlowy Vary, Bolesna Braća, Nikša Bratoš, Budjenje.

From 1985 to 1990, in der Mühlen was a partner with Vladimir Smolec in the SIM studio, which produced numerous records from a variety of notable Yugoslav artists. From 1987 to 1992, he managed the legendary club and bar at the youth centre Kulušić. bringing ground breaking acts such as the Pixies to perform life. He was part of the NYC scene in the 1990s performing in clubs Brownie's, CBGB, Mercury Lounge, The Pyramid Club, Don Hill's, Roxy NYC, Lion's Den, Downtime, Webster Hall. and touring the United States with the band TOMO.

In 1988, in der Mühlen founded IDM Music in Düsseldorf, Germany, a music publishing and rights management company which in 1992 relocated to New York City and merged with IC & M managed by Miriam in der Mühlen-Westercappel.  IDM music has collaborated with Quentin Tarantino on his movies: Kill Bill Volume 1, Death Proof, Grind House, Inglourious Basterds and Django Unchained. IDM has worked also on: Silver Linings Playbook, American Hustle, The Sopranos, Goodfellas and commercials for Microsoft, Dolce & Gabbana, Miller Brewing Company.

With IDM Music, in der Mühlen produced music for RTL Television, Vipnet, T-Mobile, Nova TV (Croatia) and Central European Media Enterprises.

He was one of the judges on the first four seasons of the Croatian version of Your Face Sounds Familiar - Tvoje lice zvuči poznato (Croatian season 1), Tvoje lice zvuči poznato (Croatian season 2), Tvoje lice zvuči poznato (Croatian season 3), Tvoje lice zvuči poznato (Croatian season 4).

Tomo's TV work as an executive music producer includes:

 Croatian version of Your Face Sounds Familiar - Tvoje lice zvuči poznato (Croatian season 1)
 Croatian version of Your Face Sounds Familiar - Tvoje lice zvuči poznato (Croatian season 2)
 Croatian version of Your Face Sounds Familiar - Tvoje lice zvuči poznato (Croatian season 3)
 Croatian version of Your Face Sounds Familiar - Tvoje lice zvuči poznato (Croatian season 4)
 Croatian 2015 and 2016 version of The Voice of Holland
 Croatian 2016 version of Got Talent - Supertalent
 Croatian 2017 version of Got Talent - Supertalent

DJ/Production

Tomo's true passion is Techno and electronic music, with regular releases on Beatport he produces tracks on Modular synthesizer systems but at the same time he shares the stage constantly with techno greats like DJ Umek, Fatima Hajji, Fernanda Martins, Christina Varela, Du'ART, Eric Sneo, Insolate, Black Lotus Berlin, Marko Nastic, Sara Landry, Coyu, Hannes Bierger.

His tracks are regularly on the Beatport top 100 Charts.

Tomo performs at festivals like Ultra Europe, SONUS Festival, LMF Las Vegas, LMF Festival, Electric Summer Festival Germany.

STEEL Venue in Rovinj is Tomo's new venture since May 18. 2019. Steel is an electronic music club, label, and event company, featuring international techno artists. Tomo is the creative director and Resident DJ at Steel Rovinj.

Albums recorded

References

Sources 
 EX YU ROCK enciklopedija 1960-2006, Janjatović Petar; 
http://www.discogs.com/artist/509405-Tomo-In-Der-Mühlen
http://www.imdb.com/name/nm6852744/

External links
https://www.beatport.com/artist/tomo-in-der-muhlen/999583
https://ra.co/dj/tomoindermuhlen
https://mixmagadria.com/read/umek-tomo-in-der-muhlen-live-from-steel-eventi
https://mixmagadria.com/read/adoo-tomo-in-der-muhlen-izdali-zajednichki-ep-novosti
https://mixmagadria.com/read/steel-i-techno-je-na-selu-pripremaju-techno-spektakl-u-pulskom-fort-bourguignonu-novosti
http://www.vecernji.hr/techno/ableton-hardver-koji-kontrolira-glazbu-927001
http://www.vecernji.hr/tv/odskrinuli-smo-vrata-uspjeha-emisije-koja-je-pred-ekrane-vratila-generacije-koje-su-televiziju-otpisale-972031
https://web.archive.org/web/20160303215217/http://www.jutarnji.hr/tomo-in-der-m-hlen-radi-album-glumcu-perrineauu/203616/
 https://itunes.apple.com/us/album/movin-on-single/id442399556

Living people
1961 births
Croatian record producers
Croatian people of German descent
German people of Croatian descent